The 2023 Kentucky gubernatorial election will be held on November 7, 2023, to choose the governor and lieutenant governor of Kentucky. Incumbent Democratic Governor Andy Beshear is running for re-election to a second term. Primaries will be held on May 16, 2023. The winner of the 2023 gubernatorial election is scheduled to be sworn in on December 12, 2023.

Background 
Kentucky is generally considered a Republican leaning state, as of 2023 both of its U.S. Senators and all but one member of the Kentucky congressional delegation belong to the Republican Party. In the 2020 presidential election, Republican Donald Trump carried Kentucky by 26 percentage points. Despite these results, the Democratic Party remains competitive, especially in certain local and state-level elections. In the 2019 Kentucky gubernatorial election, the state's Attorney General, Democrat Andy Beshear defeated incumbent Republican Matt Bevin. Bevin had been saddled with low approval ratings and heavy criticism for, among other things, signing a pension reform bill for teachers. 

Beshear, who enjoys high approval ratings with Kentucky voters, has decided to seek re-election.

Democratic primary

Candidates

Declared 
 Andy Beshear, incumbent governor
Running mate: Jacqueline Coleman, incumbent lieutenant governor
 Peppy Martin, public relations firm owner and Republican nominee for governor in 1999
 Geoff Young, perennial candidate

Endorsements

Fundraising 
Beshear is the only candidate who has filed a financial disclosure.

Results

Republican primary

Candidates

Declared 
 Daniel Cameron, Attorney General of Kentucky
 Jacob Clark
 David Cooper, member of the Kentucky Army National Guard
 Kelly Craft, former U.S. Ambassador to the United Nations
Running mate: Max Wise, state senator
 Eric Deters, suspended attorney
Running mate: Wesley Deters, former Park Hills city councilman
 Bob Devore, former McCreary County school board member and perennial candidate
 Mike Harmon, Kentucky State Auditor
Alan Keck, mayor of Somerset
 Dennis Ormerod
 Ryan Quarles, Kentucky Commissioner of Agriculture
 Johnny Rice, militia activist and former police officer
 Robbie Smith, high school teacher

Did Not File 
 Anthony Moore, wellwater drilling contractor

Withdrawn 
 Savannah Maddox, state representative

Declined 
Ralph Alvarado, state senator and nominee for lieutenant governor in 2019 (appointed commissioner of the Tennessee Department of Health)
Allison Ball, Kentucky State Treasurer (running for state auditor)
Matt Bevin, former governor
 John Schnatter, founder and former CEO of Papa John's
Max Wise, state senator (running for lieutenant governor with Craft)

Endorsements

Fundraising 
Some candidates have not filed financial disclosures. Those who have are listed below:

Polling

Graphical summary

Results

Independents

Candidates

Declared 
 Brian Bush, home remodeling contractor and U.S. Army veteran
 David Ferguson
 Clint Johnson, reverend

General election

Predictions

Polling
Andy Beshear vs. Daniel Cameron

Andy Beshear vs. Kelly Craft

Andy Beshear vs. Mike Harmon

Andy Beshear vs. Ryan Quarles

See also 
2023 United States elections
2023 United States gubernatorial elections
Governor of Kentucky

Notes 

Partisan clients

References

External links 
Official campaign websites
 Andy Beshear (D) for Governor
 Daniel Cameron (R) for Governor
 Kelly Craft (R) for Governor
 Eric Deters (R) for Governor
 Mike Harmon (R) for Governor
 Ryan Quarles (R) for Governor

Gubernatorial
Kentucky
2023